The Heidelberg Journal of International Law is an academic journal in public international law, comparative law and European law. It was established in 1929 and is published by C.H. Beck on behalf of the Max Planck Institute for Comparative Public Law and International Law. It is regarded as one of the world's leading journals in public international law. Originally published in German, it currently publishes articles in both English and German.

References

International law journals
Comparative law journals
German law journals